The following is an overview of the events of 1894 in film, including a list of films released and notable births.

Events
 January 7 
 William Kennedy Dickson receives a patent for motion picture film.
 Dickson and William Heise film their colleague, Fred Ott sneezing with the Kinetograph at Edison's Black Maria studio.
April 14 – The first commercial presentation of the Kinetoscope took place in the Holland Brothers' Kinetoscope Parlor at 1155 Broadway, New York City. 
June 6 - Charles Francis Jenkins projects a filmed motion picture before an audience in Richmond, Indiana. Earliest documented projection of a motion picture. 
Thomas Edison experiments with synchronizing audio with film; the Kinetophone is invented which loosely synchronizes a Kinetoscope image with a cylinder phonograph. 
Kinetoscope viewing parlors begin to open in major cities. Each parlor contains several machines.
Birt Acres creates a 70 mm format, which he first uses to shoot the Henley Royal Regatta.

Notable films released in 1894

Birt Acres
Crows on Saffron Hill
Haycart Crossing Hadley Green, Middlesex

Charles-Émile Reynaud
Autour d'une cabine
Rêve au coin du feu

Étienne-Jules Marey
Falling Cat
Chat en Chute Libre

William K. L. Dickson

Alleni's Boxing Monkeys
Amateur Gymnast, No. 2
Annabelle Butterfly Dance, starring Annabelle Moore
Annabelle Sun Dance, starring Annabelle Moore
Annie Oakley, starring Annie Oakley
Armand D'Ary, starring Armand D'Ary
Athlete with Wand
Babies in High Chairs
Band Drill
A Bar Room Scene
The Barbershop
Bertoldi (Mouth Support), starring Ena Bertoldi
Bertoldi (Table Contortion), starring Ena Bertoldi
Boxing, starring Jack McAuliffe
The Boxing Cats (Prof. Welton's)
Bucking Broncho, starring Lee Martin
Buffalo Bill (lost), starring William F. Cody
Buffalo Dance, starring Hair Coat, Parts His Hair and Last Horse
Caicedo (with Pole), starring Juan A. Caicedo
Caicedo (with Spurs), starring Juan A. Caicedo
Carmencita, starring Carmencita
The Carnival Dance, starring Madge Crossland, May Lucas and Lucy Murray
Chinese Laundry Scene, directed by William Heise and William K. L. Dickson and starring Phil Doreto and Robetta
Chinese Opium Den (lost)
The Cock Fight
Cock Fight, No. 2
Corbett and Courtney Before the Kinetograph, starring James J. Corbett and Peter Courtney
Cupid's Dance, starring Florence Ewer, Lenora Ewer and Mildred Ewer
Dance, starring Rosa France, Frank Lawton and Etta Williamson
Dance du Ventre
The Dickson Experimental Sound Film
Dogs Fighting
Edison Employee Picnic
Fancy Club Swinger, starring John R. Abell
Finale of 1st Act, Hoyt's 'Milk White Flag'''Fire Rescue SceneFred Ott Holding a Bird, starring Fred OttFred Ott's Sneeze, starring Fred OttFrench DancersGlenroy Bros., (no. 2)Hadj Cheriff, starring Hadji CheriffHighland DanceThe Hornbacker-Murphy Fight, starring Eugene Hornbacker and MurphyHuman Pyramid, starring Saleem NassarImperial Japanese Dance, starring the Sarashe SistersLady Fencers (With Broadswords), starring Louise Blanchard and Helen EnglehartLady Fencers (With Foils)Lasso Exhibition, starring Frank Hammitt and Lee MartinLasso Thrower (lost), starring Vicente OropezaLeonard-Cushing Fight, starring Jack Cushing and Mike LeonardLuis Martinetti, Contortionist, starring Luis MartinettiMan of a Thousand Faces, starring George LaymanMay Lucas, starring May LucasMen on Parallel BarsMexican Knife Duel (lost), starring Pedro Esquivel and Dionecio GonzalesMiss Lucy Murray, starring Lucy MurrayMlle. Capitaine, starring Alciede CapitaineOrgan Grinder, No. 1Organ Grinder, No. 2Oriental Dance, starring RosaThe Pickaninny Dance, from the 'Passing Show', starring Joe Rastus, Denny Tolliver and Walter WilkinsRat KillingRats and Terrier No. 2Rats and Terrier No. 3Rats and WeaselRuth Dennis, starring Ruth St. DenisSandow, starring Eugen Sandow
Sheik Hadji Tahar, starring Sheik Hadji Tahar
Sioux Ghost Dance
Summersault Dog, starring Lucy the Dog and Ivan Tschernoff
Sword Combat, starring Najid and Saleem Nassar
Topack and Steele, starring George W. Steele and George Topack
Toyou Kichi, starring Toyou Kichi
Trained Bears
Trapeze
Unsuccessful Somersault 
Walton and Slavin, starring John Slavin and Charles F. Walton
Whirlwind Gunspinning, starring Hadj Lessik
The Widder, starring Isabelle Coe
Wonderful Performing Dog, starring Lucy the Dog and Ivan Tschernoff
The Wrestling Dog, starring Henry Welton
Wrestling Match

Films directed by other filmmakers
Miss Jerry, directed by Alexander Black, starring by Blanche Bayliss, William Courtenay and Chauncey Depew.

Births

Debut
Annabelle Whitford (Annabelle Sun Dance)
William Courtenay (Miss Jerry)

External links

 1894  at the Internet Movie Database

References

 
Film by year
Articles containing video clips